Leo Ferdinand Dworschak (April 6, 1900 – November 5, 1976) was an American prelate of the Roman Catholic Church. He served as the fourth bishop of the Diocese of Fargo in North Dakota from 1960 to 1970.  He previously served as auxiliary bishop of the same diocese from 1947 to 1960.

Biography 
Leo Dworschak was born on April 6, 1900 in Independence, Wisconsin. His father was a Czech immigrant from around Neuhaus in the Czech Republic. Leo Dworschak was ordained to the Roman Catholic priesthood on May 29, 1926, for the Diocese of Fargo.

Coadjutor Bishop of Rapid City 
On June 22, 1946, Pope Pius XII appointed Dworschak coadjutor bishop of the Diocese of Rapid City; he was consecrated bishop on August 22, 1946.

Auxiliary Bishop and Bishop of Fargo 
On April 10, 1947, Pope Pius XII appointed Dworschak as the auxiliary bishop of the Fargo Diocese, where he was serving apostolic administrator, while Bishop Aloisius Muench was the apostolic visitor in Germany.On February 23, 1960, Pope John XXIII appointed Dworschak the fourth bishop of the Diocese of Fargo. 

Pope Paul VI accepted Dworschak's retirement as bishop of Fargo on September 8, 1970.  Leo Dworschak died in Fargo on November 5, 1976, at age 76.

References

1900 births
1976 deaths
Roman Catholic bishops of Fargo
Participants in the Second Vatican Council
People from Independence, Wisconsin
20th-century Roman Catholic bishops in the United States
Roman Catholic Diocese of Rapid City
Catholics from Wisconsin
American people of Czech descent